Knox City is a town in Knox County, Texas, United States. The population was 1,119 at the 2019 census.

Geography
Knox City is in southern Knox County, at the intersection of State Highways 6 and 222. SH 6 runs north  to Benjamin, the county seat, and south  to Rule, while SH 222 leads east  to Munday and northwest  to Guthrie.

Knox City is located on high ground  from the upper Brazos River.

Climate
The climate in this area is characterized by hot, humid summers and generally mild to cool winters.  According to the Köppen climate classification system, Knox City has a humid subtropical climate, Cfa on climate maps.

Demographics

2020 census

As of the 2020 United States census, there were 1,065 people, 427 households, and 259 families residing in the town.

2010 census

As of the census of 2010, there were 1,130 people, a decrease of 7.30% since 2000 (89 people). The racial makeup of the town was 73.54% White (831 people), 6.73% African American (76 people), 0.44% Native American (5 people), 0.18% Asian (2 people), 16.73% from other races (189 people), and 2.39% from two or more races (27 people). Hispanic or Latino of any race were 30.44% of the population (344 people).

2000 census

As of the census of 2000, there were 1,219 people, 486 households, and 320 families residing in the town. The population density was 1,457.3 people per square mile (560.3/km2). There were 613 housing units at an average density of 732.8 per square mile (281.8/km2). The racial makeup of the town was 71.86% White (876 people), 8.70% African American (106 people), 0.66% Native American (8 people), 0.41% Asian (5 people), 0.08% Pacific Islander (1 person), 14.44% from other races (176 people), and 3.86% from two or more races (47 people). Hispanic or Latino of any race were 23.54% of the population (287 people).

There were 486 households, out of which 28.8% had children under the age of 18 living with them, 52.7% were married couples living together, 10.3% had a female householder with no husband present, and 34.0% were non-families. 31.9% of all households were made up of individuals, and 20.2% had someone living alone who was 65 years of age or older. The average household size was 2.37 and the average family size was 3.01.

In the town, the population was spread out, with 25.8% under the age of 18, 7.1% from 18 to 24, 21.1% from 25 to 44, 21.5% from 45 to 64, and 24.4% who were 65 years of age or older. The median age was 42 years. For every 100 females, there were 89.6 males. For every 100 females age 18 and over, there were 87.2 males.

The median income for a household in the town was $25,583, and the median income for a family was $300,000. Males had a median income of $24,688 versus $19,318 for females. The per capita income for the town was $14,732. About 13.8% of families and 20.2% of the population were below the poverty line, including 30.5% of those under age 18 and 14.2% of those age 65 or over.

Education
The town is served by the Knox City-O'Brien Consolidated Independent School District.

In popular culture
Knox City and Lyndon Baty were featured in a 2014 episode of Snap Judgment on artificial intelligence. Lyndon Baty of Knox City has been featured on the Today Show, ESPN, and Sports Illustrated, among other popular media outlets, for being the first kid in the USA (second in the world) to attend school via a robot.

References

Towns in Knox County, Texas
Towns in Texas